Operation Toan Thang II ("Complete Victory") was an operation conducted by the US Army and the Army of the Republic of Vietnam (ARVN) during the Vietnam War between 1 June 1968 and 16 February 1969. It was designed to keep pressure on the Viet Cong (VC) and the People's Army of Vietnam (PAVN) forces at III Corps.

Background
The operation was a continuation of Operation Toan Thang I—in the same operational area and with largely the same forces.

Operation

June
On 1 June, a unit of the 2nd Brigade, 1st Infantry Division found a PAVN/VC base camp near Dầu Tiếng Base Camp with an arms cache containing 81 SKS rifles, three light machine guns, and two radios. At 14:25, a unit of the 1st Brigade (9th Infantry Division) air assaulted into a hot landing zone near Bến Lức District and engaged PAVN/VC forces, who withdrew at 19:15, leaving 11 dead.

On 2 June, between 01:40 and 03:25, 15 rounds of mortar/rocket fire hit Saigon killing five civilians and destroying three houses. The enemy withdrew at 18:00, leaving 33 dead among 37 destroyed bunkers. The enemy withdrew at 18:15 leaving 12 dead; U.S. losses were 3 killed.

On 4 June, between 01:03 and 01:45, 40 rounds of mortar/rocket fire hit Saigon injuring 12 civilians and causing minor damage to two ships. On 5 June at 01:25, a unit of the 11th Armored Cavalry Regiment (11th ACR) received 50 rounds of mortar fire in a night defensive position near Trảng Bàng District. The unit returned fire, supported by artillery and an AC-47 Spooky gunship, and the enemy withdrew at 02:50 leaving seven dead and one captured and two individual and two crew-served weapons. The base camp and village at Lai Khê was hit by five 122 mm rockets killing three civilians.

On 6 June, six mortar/rocket rounds hit Chợ Lớn killing 11 civilians. At 15:30, ten rounds of 82 mm mortar fire hit Gia Định Province killing two civilians. At 18:46, eight rounds of 82 mm mortar fire hit Bảo Trị, injuring nine civilians. A unit of the 25th Infantry Division engaged an enemy force near Hóc Môn District supported by artillery, helicopter gunships, and airstrikes killing 32 PAVN/VC troops; U.S. losses were four killed.

At 03:00 on 7 June, 13 rockets hit Saigon killing two civilians. On 8 June, 22 82 mm mortar rounds hit Saigon. At 18:50, five 82 mm mortar rounds hit Sông Bé Province killing two civilians. On 9 June at 03:00, three rounds of mortar fire hit the vicinity of the Newport Bridge. Bien Hoa Air Base received 35 rounds of mortar fire; at 23:30 of the same day, four rounds of mortar fire hit the area clost to the Cha Va Bridge.

On 10 June, between 02:05 and 02:10, ten 122 mm rockets hit Saigon, killing seven civilians. On 11 June, between 06:15 and 06:25, 25 122 mm rockets hit Saigon killing 19 civilians. On 12 June, ten 122 mm rockets hit Tan Son Nhut Air Base killing two U.S. civilians and four Vietnamese civilians.

On 15 June at 01:15, 20 mortar rounds hit southwest Saigon injuring two policemen and three civilians. At 03:00, 60 107 mm rockets hit Bien Hoa Air Base causing minimal damage. At 18:00, a unit of the 2nd Brigade, 1st Infantry Division found eight 107 mm rockets in the same general area.

On 16 June at 02:50, a unit of the 2nd Brigade, the 25th Infantry Division, which was in a night defensive position in Gia Định Province, received mortar fire followed by a ground attack. The unit returned fire supported by artillery, helicopter gunships, and an AC-47; the enemy withdrew at 09:40 leaving 52 dead and 21 individual and four crew-served weapons; U.S. losses were three killed. The battle continued until early morning when the enemy withdrew leaving 25 dead; U.S. losses were 11 killed.
The enemy withdrew at 19:05 leaving 39 dead; U.S. losses were two killed. A unit of the 3rd Brigade found four 107 mm rockets 6 miles east of Saigon.

At 23:39, five 122 mm rockets hit northern Saigon killing six civilians. On 21 June at 00:15, five 107 mm rockets hit Tan Son Nhut Air Base killing six civilians. At 11:45, a unit of the 3rd Brigade, 101st Airborne Division engaged two reinforced enemy companies near Hiệp Hòa, the enemy withdrew at 21:30, leaving 35 dead; U.S. losses were one killed.

On 22 June at 02:15, eight mortar/rocket rounds hit the Saigon docks causing minor damage. The enemy withdrew at 23:45, and a sweep the next morning found 41 PAVN/VC dead, two captured and 11 individual and five crew-served weapons; U.S. losses were four killed. At 10:20, a unit of the 3rd Brigade, 9th Infantry Division, engaged an enemy force in the same area; other units reinforced and the enemy withdrew at 23:00. A sweep of the area the next day revealed 46 PAVN/VC dead and 13 weapons captured; U.S. losses were five killed. A subsequent sweep by the 17th Cavalry Regiment found 20 PAVN/VC dead.

From 23 June, Australia's 4th Battalion (4 RAR/NZ) joined the operation, deploying to the Biên Hòa-Long Khánh Province border to assist their 1st Battalion (1 RAR). 4 RAR/NZ's role was to seal enemy infiltration routes into Saigon and to identify rocket-launching sites. Only one contact was made by the New Zealand infantry company of 4 RAR/NZ. On 3 July, 1 RAR left the operation.

On 26 June, units of the 1st and 3rd Brigades of the 9th Infantry Division continued to engage the enemy force northeast of Tân An. The enemy withdrew at 15:00 leaving 40 dead, 9 captured and 16 individual and two crew-served weapons; U.S. losses were 11 killed.

Action continued until 06:00 on 29 June and resulted in 30 PAVN/VC and five U.S. troops killed.

Operational results for the month were 1,533 PAVN/VC killed, 520 captured and 574 individual and 89 crew-served weapons captured. U.S. losses were 181 killed.

July
On 3 July at 02:20, Dầu Tiếng Base Camp received 450 rounds of 60mm mortar fire and 50 107mm rockets followed by a ground assault, the defenders from the 3rd Brigade, 25th Infantry Division, fought back supported by AC-47 fire; U.S. losses were 5 killed. At 09:00 a unit of the 3rd Brigade, 1st Infantry Division, found a weapons cache in Biên Hòa Province containing four 122 mm rockets and one 107 mm rocket.

On 4 July, a unit of the 1st Brigade, 1st Infantry Division, found a bunker complex and weapons cache in Bình Dương Province containing seven RPG-7 launchers, 110 RPG-7 grenades and an 82 mm mortar.

On 8 July at 02:00, five mortar rounds hit the Nhà Bè tank farm causing minimal damage. On 9 July at 01:00, United States Navy Patrol Boat, Rivers (PBR) attacked three enemy sampans on the Đồng Nai river killing three PAVN/VC.

On 20 July at midnight, five 107 mm rockets hit the Nhà Bè tank farm causing minimal damage. A unit of the 2nd Brigade, 1st Infantry Division, patrolling in Bình Dương Province, found a supply cache containing four individual weapons, assorted munitions and food.

On 25 July at 08:15, a unit of the 3rd Brigade, 25th Infantry Division, was ambushed by an enemy force 2 miles northeast of Trảng Bàng killing 20 and capturing one individual and two crew-served weapons; U.S. losses were 13 killed.

On 27 July, a company from the 1st Brigade, 9th Infantry Division, patrolling in Long An Province found two sampans carrying munitions including 212 60 mm mortar rounds and 35 RPG-2 grenades. On 31 July, a unit of the 1st Brigade, 1st Infantry Division found a 25-ton rice cache in Bình Long Province.

Cumulative operational results to the end of July were 2,479 PAVN/VC killed, 1,119 captured and 836 individual and 184 crew-served weapons captured. U.S. losses were 319 killed. U.S intelligence determined that during the month that the 7th Division had relocated to northern Bình Long Province while the 9th Division had moved from Hậu Nghĩa Province to western Tây Ninh Province. Captured documents indicated that a renewed PAVN/VC offensive was to start sometime after 5 August.

August

On 6 August, another UH-1 was shot down 9 miles southeast of Phước Vĩnh.

On 7 August, in Long An Province, units of the 1st and 3rd Brigades, 9th Infantry Division, supported by helicopter gunships, killed 39 PAVN/VC and captured ten and 14 individual and two crew-served weapons; U.S. losses were eight killed.

U.S. helicopter gunships hit the firing area and ARVN forces swept the area finding 20 PAVN/VC dead. At 21:15, a platoon from the 2nd Brigade, 25th Infantry Division, ambushed 25 PAVN/VC 2 miles southeast of Trảng Bàng killing ten and capturing two individual weapons.

On 15 August, the 11th ACR's Blackhorse Base Camp was hit by 20 107 mm rockets causing minimal damage.

On 18 August, the PAVN/VC began their Phase III Offensive, in III Corps—the major attacks were mounted against Tây Ninh and Lộc Ninh. At 01:15, Katum Camp was attacked by the VC 5th Sapper Battalion, who were beaten back losing 59 troops and 20 individual and seven crew-served weapons. Other brigade units reinforced and artillery, helicopter gunships and air support was provided, 66 PAVN/VC were killed and 25 captured and 29 individual and eight crew-served weapons; U.S. losses were three killed. On 19 August, at 21:25, Katum Camp received 325 rounds of mortar fire followed by a ground probe. The enemy withdrew after 15 minutes with unknown losses.

On 22 August, between 04:40 and 05:25, Saigon was hit by 20 122 mm rockets killing 14 civilians. Between 04:45 and 08:35, three merchant ships were attacked by fire in the Long Tau shipping channel causing minimal damage. At 14:20, two 82 mm mortar rounds hit the Sông Bé hospital injuring 30 patients.

On 25 August at 22:30, Bien Hoa Air Base was hit by 15 107/122 mm rockets causing minimal damage. At 10:30, a company from the 3rd Brigade, 101st Airborne Division engaged an enemy unit 4 miles north of Trảng Bàng killing 103 and capturing 22 and 20 individual and four crew-served weapons; U.S. losses were 16 killed. At 23:55, three 107 mm rockets hit south of the Y Bridge in Saigon killing one civilian.

On 30 August, a company from the 3rd Brigade, 9th Infantry Division, engaged an enemy platoon 7 miles east of Tân An killing 12 and capturing two and three individual weapons. At 23:00 Bien Hoa Air Base was hit by 20 122 mm rockets causing minimal damage.

Cumulative operational results at the end of August were 5,180 PAVN/VC killed, 3,048 captured and 1,591 individual and 375 crew-served weapons captured. U.S. troopskilled577 killed.

September
A UH-1 was shot down 12 miles northeast of Tân An killing three.

Elements of the armored cavalry squadron of the 25th Infantry Division and other units from the Brigade maneuvered into blocking positions. Artillery, helicopter gunships and airstrikes were provided in support. By 16:00, additional units of the Brigade reinforced and took up blocking positions in an attempt to cordon the enemy force, then estimated at battalion size. Contact continued into the evening of the 5th and morning of the 6th when the ARVN 2nd Battalion, 49th Regiment, 25th Division, was inserted into the area. Sporadic action continued and contact was finally lost at 13:30 on the 6th when the enemy evaded the cordon. The total number off PAVN/VC killed in the 2-day battle was 103; U.S. losses were 31 killed.

On 6 September at 23:30, a 122 mm rocket hit an area in the southwest of Saigon killing one civilian and destroying a house. At 18:30, another company joined the action, which continued until the enemy withdrew at 10:30 on 8 September, leaving 35 dead, two captured, six AK-47s, six SKSs, one RPD machine gun, two 60 mm mortars and two 82 mm mortars; U.S. losses were 12 killed.

The infantry engaged an enemy force and were reinforced by other Brigade units and units of the 3rd Brigade. The enemy withdrew after dark leaving 48 dead and three captured and 18 individual weapons; U.S. losses were two killed. On 11 September at 04:30, a mechanized infantry element of the 2nd Brigade, 25th Infantry Division, occupying night-defensive positions 3 miles west-southwest of Dầu Tiếng, received mortar and small arms fire followed by a ground attack. Another unit of the Brigade reinforced it and contact was lost at 07:10 when the enemy withdrew, leaving 99 dead and one captured along with 18 AK-47s, five RPDs, two RPG launchers, two pistols and a radio. U.S. losses were three killed.

Three more companies were inserted into the area and artillery, helicopter gunship and air support was provided. The enemy withdrew, leaving 20 dead and one captured as well as nine individual and one crew-served weapons; U.S. losses were four killed.

The unit was supported by artillery and helicopter gunships and the enemy withdrew leaving 42 killed, one captured, and 11 individual and eight crew-served weapons; U.S. losses were two killed. The enemy withdrew after 35 minutes but the unit pursued and reengaged, killing a total of 28. Artillery and helicopter gunship support was provided and the enemy withdrew leaving 26 dead; U.S. losses were seven killed. At 23:00, a 25th Infantry Division firebase 9 miles northeast of Go Dau Ha received mortar fire followed by a ground attack. The defenders returned the fire, supported by artillery, and the enemy withdrew at 06:30. A unit of the 101st Airborne Division swept the area finding 131 PAVN/VC dead and four captured and seven individual and five crew-served weapons; U.S. losses were four killed.

The attack was repulsed with artillery and helicopter gunship support, killing 49 PAVN/VC, and capturing 11 individual and nine crew-served weapons.

The enemy withdrew at 20:10, leaving 15 dead; U.S. losses were three killed. The enemy withdrew at 03:00, leaving 37 dead and one captured as well as 14 individual and three crew-served weapons, 30 RPG grenades and 6,500 rounds of small arms ammunition.

The unit returned fire supported by artillery, helicopter gunships and an AC-47, the enemy withdrew at 04:30, leaving 19 dead; U.S. losses were two killed. On 24 September at 02:20 ten rockets hit the Nhà Bè tank farm causing minimal damage. Artillery and helicopter gunship fire was directed onto the firing location with unknown results. The unit was reinforced by another brigade unit and supported by artillery, helicopter gunship and airstrikes. The battle continued until the next morning when the enemy withdrew, leaving 39 dead and two captured, and nine individual and one crew-served weapon; U.S. losses were one killed.

On 28 September at midnight, three 122 mm rockets hit the south of Saigon. At 23:35, Long Binh Post received 40 82 mm mortar rounds, causing minimal damage.

Cumulative operational results at the end of September were 7,144 PAVN/VC killed, 3,578 captured with 2,233 individual and 515 crew-served weapons captured. U.S. losses were 765 killed.

October

The enemy withdrew at 18:15 leaving 14 dead and three captured, and three individual weapons and assorted munitions. On 3 October at 23:40, three 107 mm rockets hit the Nhà Bè tank farm causing minimal damage, artillery and helicopter gunship fire was directed onto the firing location with unknown results.

The enemy broke contact at 11:40 but another unit of the squadron engaged the enemy until they withdrew at 16:45, leaving 43 dead, and 13 individual and four crew-served weapons; U.S. losses were one killed.

On 7 October at 07:45, a company from the 3rd Brigade, 1st Infantry Division, patrolling in Bình Dương Province, found a base complex and weapons cache containing over 1,000 anti-personnel mines, 1,050 grenades, 19 individual weapons and 87 RPG grenades. The unit was supported by artillery and helicopter gunships and the battle continued until the early morning, resulting in 147 PAVN killed, seven captured and three individual and one crew-served weapons captured; U.S. losses were eight killed.

Units of the 1st and 3rd Brigades reinforced and artillery, helicopter gunships and airstrikes were provided in support. The enemy withdrew leaving 26 dead, one AK-47, one 60 mm mortar and two 82 mm mortars; U.S. losses were six killed.

At 13:00, helicopter gunships supporting the unit killed a further ten PAVN/VC as they attempted to escape  to the northwest. On 12 October at 16:30, the aerorifle platoon from the 25th Infantry Division was led by a Chieu Hoi to a weapons cache 4 miles northwest of Bao Trai, which contained over 10,000 rounds of 7.62×39 mm, 50 82 mm mortar rounds and 100 grenades.

While searching the wreckage the PBRs received fire from the riverbanks and responded in kind.

The unit was joined by another brigade unit and RF forces, who attempted to establish a cordon around the enemy position. However, by 19:25 the enemy withdrew leaving 16 dead and one captured as well as two individual and one crew-served weapons. The defenders returned fire, supported by artillery and airstrikes, and the enemy withdrew in the early afternoon leaving 80 dead and 26 individual and six crew-served weapons; U.S. losses were eight killed. A sweep of the area on 27 October found a further 23 PAVN dead and one more U.S. soldier killed. At 23:30, ten 107 mm rockets hit Bien Hoa Air Base causing minimal damage.

The enemy withdrew at 13:30, leaving 31 dead and two captured, and three individual and two crew-served weapons. A company from the 1st Brigade, 25th Infantry Division, was landed in the area and engaged them until they withdrew at 13:00, leaving 11 dead; U.S. losses were one killed. At 15:00, helicopter gunships from the 12th Combat Aviation Group engaged an enemy platoon 7 miles east of Dầu Tiếng killing 18. The enemy withdrew at 15:30 leaving 42 dead. At 21:30 eight 107/122 mm rockets hit Saigon killing two civilians.

Cumulative operational results at the end of October were 9,277 PAVN/VC killed, 5,110 captured and 2,474 individual and 608 crew-served weapons captured. U.S. losses were 942 killed.

November
On 1 November at 01:20, five 107/122 mm rockets were fired at Tan Son Nhut Air Base causing minimal damage. At 03:30, five mortar/rocket rounds hit the Nhà Bè tank farm causing minimal damage. At 03:45, Firebase Rita of the 1st Brigade, 1st Infantry Division, was attacked by a PAVN force, followed by mortar/rocket fire and then another ground attack at 06:55. The defenders returned fire – supported by artillery, helicopter gunships and airstrikes – and the PAVN withdrew leaving 27 dead; U.S. losses were 12 killed. Lieutenant colonel Charles Calvin Rogers would be awarded the Medal of Honor for his defense of the base. At 06:30, three rockets hit Saigon killing 19 civilians.

Three UH-1s were shot down in Bình Dương and Hậu Nghĩa Provinces with one U.S. soldier killed. On 5 November at 14:45, a company from the 3rd Brigade (25th Infantry Division) operating 4 miles east of Dầu Tiếng, engaged an entrenched enemy force, killing seven. At 12:30, the S.S. President Jefferson received RPG and small arms fire on the Nhà Bè causing minimal damage, PBRs and helicopter gunships attacked the firing positions with unknown results.

On 6 November at 20:00, 20 82 mm mortar rounds hit Bến Cát. At 21:30, a 107 mm rocket hit Nhà Bè killing one civilian. The enemy withdrew leaving 15 dead; U.S. losses were four killed.

On 9 November, it was announced that the 1st Cavalry Division had started redeploying to III Corps from I Corps and would be based at Phước Vĩnh Base Camp and would join the operation. U.S. losses were one killed. At 20:15, a unit from the 2nd Brigade, 1st Infantry Division, ambushed ten PAVN/VC 9 miles northeast of Saigon; the enemy withdrew after 25 minutes leaving six dead and five individual weapons.

The enemy withdrew at 15:40, leaving 28 dead and one individual and three crew-served weapons; U.S. losses were one killed. The enemy withdrew at 17:30, leaving 16 dead and three individual weapons. On 13 November at 09:40, the S.S. Fred Morris received RPG fire on the Long Tau shipping channel causing minimal damage. PBRs and helicopter gunships attacked the firing positions with unknown results. A later sweep of the area by a unit of the 2nd Brigade, 25th Infantry Division, found 16 dead and six individual weapons. At 13:30, a company from the 3rd Brigade, 1st Cavalry Division, was attacked 4 miles west of An Lộc. The unit returned fire, supported by helicopter gunships and airstrikes, killing 12 PAVNVC; U.S. losses were two killed. At 17:15, aeroscouts of the 1st Brigade, 1st Cavalry Division, engaged 40–50 PAVN/VC supported by artillery, killing 38.

Air cavalry troops from the squadron were landed and found 18 PAVN/VC dead, and one individual weapon and five tons of rice.

The unit returned fire supported by artillery, helicopter gunships and airstrikes; the enemy withdrew at 08:00 but the unit pursued and reestablished contact and action continued until the enemy withdrew at 15:30, leaving 15 dead as well as three individual and one crew-served weapons. Further sweeps of the area over the next two days brought total enemy losses to 44 killed, and 19 individual and six crew-served weapons. An OH-6 was shot down 4 miles east-southeast of Trảng Bàng, killing three.

Later, in the same area, helicopter gunships from the 1/9th Cavalry killed six PAVN/VC. The unit returned fire—supported by artillery, helicopter gunships and an AC-47. The enemy withdrew at 06:45, leaving 12 dead, one captured, and 12 individual and one crew-served weapons; U.S. losses were one killed. A UH-1 was shot down 6 miles northwest of Katum killing one on board.

The PAVN/VC fighters withdrew after 15 minutes, leaving ten dead.

The U.S. force was supported by artillery, helicopter gunships an airstrikes and an RF unit and another brigade unit arrived to reinforce. The enemy withdrew at 16:10, leaving six dead, and six individual and one crew-served weapons; U.S. losses were fifteen killed. A company from the brigade was landed in the area and found 10 PAVN/VC dead and captured eight and six individual and one crew-served weapons.

The enemy withdrew after three hours, leaving 54 dead. The next day, during a sweep of the area, a further 71 bodies were found, and on 28 November, helicopters from the 1/9th Cavalry located a further 15 bodies bringing the cumulative total to 138 killed, six captured and 40 weapons captured; U.S. losses were five killed. The enemy withdrew at 17:30, leaving 22 dead and two individual and one crew-served weapons.

The enemy withdrew after an hour leaving ten dead; U.S. losses were two killed. On 27 November at 08:50, RF units supported by artillery and airstrikes engaged an enemy battalion 9 miles west-southwest of Go Dau Ha. In the afternoon, further RF units and a unit of the 1st Brigade, 25th Infantry, provided reinforcements, with fighting continuing into the night. PAVN/VC losses were 96 killed, and ten individual and two crew-served weapons captured. The enemy withdrew at 16:30, leaving 58 dead, and 13 individual and nine crew-served weapons. At 13:50, a unit of the 3rd Brigade, 25th Infantry Division, was air-assaulted into an area 8 miles southeast of Tây Ninh and immediately engaged by an enemy force. Two UH-1s were shot down in the landing zone. Reinforcements arrived and the enemy withdrew at 20:40, leaving one dead; U.S. losses were 15 killed.

The enemy withdrew an hour later leaving 37 dead, one captured, and nine individual and six crew-served weapons; U.S. losses were three killed. Contact was lost at 10:30, but then reestablished at 13:15, and the fighting continued until 16:30, when the enemy withdrew leaving 71 dead.

The PAVN withdrew at 15:30, leaving 78 dead; U.S. losses were seven killed.

Cumulative operational results at the end of November were 11,856 PAVN/VC killed, 6,320 captured, and 3,228 individual and 748 crew-served weapons captured. U.S. losses were 1,205 killed.

December
Air cavalry troops were landed in the area and engaged an enemy force at 16:00, supported by a unit of the 1st Infantry Division. The enemy withdrew after an hour leaving 24 dead; U.S. losses were one killed. The enemy withdrew after 30 minutes leaving nine dead, two captured, and three individual weapons and four radios. The enemy withdrew leaving 14 killed, 17 captured and eight individual weapons.

Supporting fire was called in and the battle continued until 15:00, when the enemy withdrew leaving one dead; U.S. losses were 25 killed. The unit was supported by artillery and helicopter gunships, and the enemy withdrew at 05:15, leaving 37 dead along with nine individual and two crew-served weapons. At 15:10, a unit of the 3rd Brigade, 1st Cavalry Division sweeping the area 15 miles west-southwest of Phước Bình, was attacked by an enemy force; the enemy withdrew after 50 minutes.

At 22:15, a U.S. Army position near Bien Hoa Air Base received 25 82 mm mortar rounds causing minimal damage. On 6 December – between midnight and 02:15 – numerous U.S., ARVN and South Vietnamese Government installations in and around An Lộc received mortar and rocket fire that caused minimal damage. Between 01:00 and 02:15, mortar/rocket attacks on Tây Ninh also caused minimal damage.

The enemy withdrew after ten minutes leaving 16 dead; U.S. losses were one killed. At 20:00, 15 107/122 mm rockets hit Long Binh Post causing minimal damage. The enemy withdrew at 13:40, but the unit pursued and reengaged until the enemy withdrew at 16:30, leaving 93 dead and one crew-served weapon and 53 RPG-2 grenades; U.S. losses were 14 killed. The enemy withdrew, leaving 14 dead as well as two individual and three crew-served weapons; U.S. losses were two soldiers and one Kit Carson Scout killed. At 23:30, U.S. and ARVN positions around An Lộc received mortar fire that caused minimal damage.

The PAVN withdrew after two hours, but were pursued by helicopter gunships and finally broke contact at 18:15 leaving 14 dead, one captured, and one individual and one crew-served weapons; U.S. losses were two killed. The enemy withdrew after three hours leaving 14 dead, and one crew-served weapon and two multiple 107 mm rocket launchers; U.S. losses were three killed. The enemy then withdrew, but the unit reestablished contact at 10:50 and was reinforced by another brigade unit, supported by artillery, helicopter gunships and airstrikes. The enemy withdrew at 17:45, leaving ten dead and two captured; U.S. losses were two killed.

On 15 December at 04:30, the Dầu Tiếng Base Camp was hit by 30 rounds of 82 mm mortar, causing minimal damage.

The convoy security forces engaged the enemy, supported by artillery, helicopter gunships and airstrikes, and were reinforced by mechanized infantry of the Division’s 3rd Brigade. The enemy withdrew at 13:40 leaving 73 dead; U.S. losses were five killed. At 10:00, mechanized infantry from the 2nd Brigade, 25th Infantry Division, patrolling 4 miles north-northwest of Củ Chi, engaged an enemy squadron; contact was lost at 12:15 but regained at 15:30. The enemy withdrew at 18:45 leaving 15 dead; U.S. losses were one killed. A search of the bunkers found 17 PAVN/VC dead.

The unit was supported by artillery, helicopter gunships and airstrikes, and later reinforced by an addition four companies inserted into blocking positions. The enemy withdrew at 21:30, leaving 30 dead, and three individual and four crew-served weapons; U.S. losses were one killed. At 14:40 an aerial observer saw 60 PAVN/VC 3 miles east of Dầu Tiếng and directed artillery fire onto them killing 15.

The unit was supported by helicopter gunships and another MRF unit joined the battle. The enemy withdrew at 15:25, leaving 14 dead, 18 captured and 14 individual weapons. The unit returned fire, supported by artillery, helicopter gunships, AC-47s and airstrikes. The enemy withdrew at 06:35, and a sweep of the area by the unit and a unit of the ARVN Airborne Division found 81 PAVN/VC dead, 25 AK-47s, nine light machineguns, three pistols, 78 RPG-2 grenades, 38 RPG-7 grenades and two radios. A further sweep of the area found another 22 PAVN/VC dead; U.S. losses were 17 killed.

On 24 December at 18:00, a Christmas ceasefire came into effect. At 21:55, a U.S. Navy PBR engaged a sampan near the Bến Lức bridge; all three on board jumped into the river and one was captured along with an AK-47.

The PAVN withdrew at 16:30, leaving 52 dead, three captured, and three individual and five crew-served weapons; U.S. losses were two killed.

In response they attacked the firing positions and called in airstrikes. A survey of the strike area discovered 59 PAVN/VC dead. At 20:00, Phước Vĩnh Base Camp was hit by 40 107 mm rockets and 75 mm recoilless rifle fire, and an hour later by five mortar rounds; the attacks caused little damage. On 30 December at 09:30, five 107 mm rockets hit Dầu Tiếng Base Camp, causing minimal damage.

Cumulative operational results to the end of December were 13,777 PAVN/VC killed, 6,973 captured and 3,868 individual and 878 crew-served weapons captured. U.S. losses were 1,523 killed.

January
On 1 January, Staff Sergeant Rodney J. T. Yano, of the air cavalry squadron of the 11th ACR, saved the lives of the crew of his UH-1, when a white phosphorus grenade exploded on the helicopter during operations near Biên Hòa. For his actions, he was posthumously awarded the Medal of Honor. On 3 January, an explosion in the mess hall of the 20th Engineer Brigade at Củ Chi Base Camp killed 15. On 11 January 1969, a convoy was ambushed on Highway 13 near Quần Lợi. First Lieutenant Harold A. Fritz organized the defense, actions for which he was later awarded the Medal of Honor. On 14 January, a convoy of the 48th Transportation Group was ambushed in Tây Ninh Province. 122 PAVN/VC were killed, and three individual and one crew-served weapons were captured; U.S. losses were seven killed. Also on 14 January in Tây Ninh Province, First Lieutenant John E. Warren Jr. smothered an enemy hand grenade with his body, an action for which he was posthumously awarded the Medal of Honor. On 31 January, a unit of the 2nd Battalion, 12th Cavalry Regiment, found 69 tons of rice in two caches in Tây Ninh Province.

February
The defenders returned fire, supported by artillery, helicopter gunships, AC-47s and airstrikes, and the enemy withdrew at 04:45, leaving behind 14 dead; U.S. losses were two killed.

The enemy withdrew at 19:10 leaving 18 dead; U.S. losses were six killed. The unit was supported by artillery, helicopter gunships and airstrikes, and reinforced at 18:20 by a South Vietnamese Marine battalion. The enemy withdrew at 23:10 leaving 42 dead; U.S. losses were three killed. The enemy withdrew at 17:50 leaving 18 dead, seven captured, and three individual and one crew-served weapons; U.S. losses were two killed.

On 4 February at 00:50, Katum Camp was hit by 100 rounds of 60/82/120 mm mortar fire causing little damage. On 5 February, a UH-1 was shot down in Long Khánh Province killing four on board.

The enemy withdrew at 19:45, leaving 12 dead, and seven individual and four crew-served weapons; U.S. losses were one soldier and one Kit Carson Scout killed. The unit was supported by artillery, helicopter gunships and airstrikes until the enemy withdrew at 19:45, leaving 22 dead, and two individual and one crew-served weapon; U.S. losses were five killed. Aerorifle troops were landed and found 16 PAVN/VC dead and one crew-served weapon among eight destroyed bunkers. At 16:30, a CIDG unit searching a bunker complex in the same area was engaged by an enemy force and supporting fire was provided by helicopter gunships and airstrikes until the enemy withdrew at 17:40. The 1/9th Cavalry aerorifle platoon was landed and found 17 PAVN/VC killed and one crew-served weapon.

Nearby, a reconnaissance unit found a 122 mm rocket firing position. Both positions were hit by artillery, helicopter gunships, AC-47s and airstrikes throughout the night causing numerous secondary explosions; 50 PAVN/VC casualties were discovered in the strike areas. The firing continued for 20 minutes until the enemy withdrew. Artillery and airstrikes were called in killing 64 PAVN/VC.

An hour later, another unit operating in the same area found another 6 tons of rice and destroyed 48 bunkers. The unit returned fire, supported by artillery and helicopter gunships. The enemy withdrew leaving three dead and nine 107 mm rockets and an RPG launcher; U.S. losses were two killed. At 09:40, two UH-1s extracting troops from the area were shot down resulting in five U.S. killed.

The unit returned fire, supported by helicopter gunships and airstrikes, and the enemy withdrew at 17:25; U.S. losses were one killed. The enemy withdrew at 17:30, leaving 32 dead, and 15 individual and six crew-served weapons. At 18:00, Allied forces suspended operations for a 24 hour Tết ceasefire.

Aftermath
The operation ended on 16 February 1969. A total of 25,428 PAVN/VC were killed, 10,724 prisoners and suspects were captured as well as 10,285 individual and 2,307 crew-served weapons along with 1,698 tons of rice. U.S. losses were 1,798 killed. It was immediately followed by Operation Toan Thang III, conducted by the same units in the same operational area.

References

1968 in Vietnam
1969 in Vietnam
Battles and operations of the Vietnam War in 1968
Battles and operations of the Vietnam War in 1969
Toan Thang III
Battles involving the United States
Battles involving Vietnam
History of Bình Dương province
History of Bình Phước Province
History of Đồng Nai Province
History of Ho Chi Minh City
History of Long An Province
History of Tây Ninh Province